Nine by Nine (stylized as NINE BY NINE or 9x9) was a nine-member Thai boy group formed in 2018. The members were brought together in a special one-year project created in collaboration of 4Nologue with Nadao Bangkok. From 2018 to 2019, the group has released one mini-album and five songs, embarked on a three concert series, and appeared as cast members for Thai TV series In Family We Trust (2018) and Great Men Academy (2019). The group disbanded in March 2019 when the duration of the special project has formally ended.

Members

Career

4NOLOGUE held a press conference on 1 March 2018 to unveil the project and introduce the members of Nine by Nine. The label's CEO Anuwat Wichiennarat says the group members are set to star in two television series, to be produced by Nadao Bangkok. The group underwent a full year of hard training, which aims to develop each members' singing and dancing skills. Their first television series was In Family We Trust where they took on the roles as the grandchildren of a Thai Chinese business family.

Nine by Nine officially debuted on 8 November 2018, releasing their debut single "Night Light" and its music video. The second single entitled "Hypnotize" was released on December 22, 2018, in an exclusive first official streaming on JOOX. The 'Hypnotize' Music Video was released on 9 January 2019 and was available to stream in various online channels. In February 2019, Nine by Nine released their third single entitled "The Lucky One" which also served as the official soundtrack for their second TV series, Great Men Academy.

The fourth single "Shouldn't" was released on 7 March 2019, days before the group's last concert. Nine by Nine's last single entitled "Eternity", was released and performed for the first time, on 9 March 2019 during the EN(D)ROUTE concert in Impact Arena. The music video for the song featured scenes from the final concert and other behind-the-scene videos of the group.

Almost a year after Nine by Nine's disbandment, seven out of the nine members made a surprise appearance as a group and performed at the 2020 Line TV Awards where they also received the Best Viral Scene Award for Great Men Academy.

Concert tours 
Shortly after their debut, Nine by Nine embarked on a concert tour entitled "9x9 On The Route". They performed at various venues until the end of December 2018.

By the end of January 2019, 4nologue announced the start of a second concert tour entitled "9x9 Thailand Tour: Route to the Destination". The first concert was on 2 February 2019, with the last concert date on 23 February 2019.

On 9 March 2019, the Nine by Nine project has ended and the group performed their last concert date dubbed as the 'One-year Finale of the Nine by Nine Project', "The 9x9 THE FINAL CONCERT: EN[D] ROUTE".

Filmography 

The Nine by Nine members have starred and take on the main roles in the Thai TV series In Family We Trust. Their respective character's names are as follows:

 Thanapob as Yi
 Jaylerr as Pete
 James as Vegas
 Captain as Earn
 Third as Tao
 Porsche as Kuaitiao
 Paris as Chi
 Jackie as Toei
 Ryu as Macau

In 2019, seven of the Nine by Nine members appeared in the TV series, Great Men Academy with their respective character's names as follows:

 James as Love
 Paris as Vier
 Jaylerr as Tangmo
 Captain as Sean
 Porsche as Good
 Third as Nuclear
 Jackie as Menn

Aside from the two TV series, Nine by Nine also appeared in two musical series on the streaming platform Line TV entitled Into The Light (2018) and The Journey of 9x9 Documentary (2019).

Discography

Mini Album

Music video

Awards and nominations

References

External links 

Nine by Nine on Line TV
Nine by Nine Press Conference (4nologue)

Thai boy bands
2018 establishments in Thailand
Musical groups established in 2018